
Year 106 BC was a year of the pre-Julian Roman calendar. At the time it was known as the Year of the Consulship of Caepio and Serranus (or, less frequently, year 648 Ab urbe condita) and the Fifth Year of Yuanfeng. The denomination 106 BC for this year has been used since the early medieval period, when the Anno Domini calendar era became the prevalent method in Europe for naming years.

Events 
 By place 
 Roman Republic 
 The Romans under Quintus Servilius Caepio seize the Gold of Tolosa while recapturing the Volcae town.

 Anatolia 
 Nicomedes III of Bithynia and Mithridates VI of Pontus share their dominion over Paphlagonia.
 China 
 Following the death of General-in-Chief Wei Qing, his sister Empress Wei Zifu and nephew Crown Prince Liu Ju begin to lose influence at court.

Births 
 January 3 – Cicero, Roman politician and author (d. 43 BC)
 September 29 – Pompey the Great, Roman general and politician (d. 48 BC)
 Servius Sulpicius Rufus, Roman politician (d. 43 BC)

Deaths 
 Wei Qing, Chinese general of the Han Dynasty

References